Tochitură is a traditional Romanian and Moldovan dish made from pork cut into small cubes, (tochitura comes from the verb "a topi" which means "melted slow fried meat in fat") cooked over low fire in its own fat and juices usually in a cast-iron pot. It is traditionally served with over-easy eggs and mămăligă. The tochitură moldovenească is the Moldavian version and the tochitură ardelenească is the Transylvanian version.

Tochitură is made in two main varieties: with or without tomato sauce and can be made from beef, lamb or chicken (depends on the area - Moldova, Transilvania, Oltenia, Muntenia, Dobrogea).  To not be confused with a stew, the amount of tomato sauce should be minimal (and usually added at the end) so the meat will cook in its own juices. The version with tomato sauce is the most common and it is prepared in most restaurants, but is less "traditional". The one without it has a sauce of pork fat and juices from the parts of the meat. The traditional Romanian dish contains not only raw meat, but parts of internal organs of the animal, like liver, kidneys, heart, pork fat (slănină) or bacon and smoked sausages fried together. It is served with mămăligă and a salty sheep cheese, either telemea or brânză de burduf.

See also
 List of stews
 Tocană

Notes and references

External links 

Romanian stews
Moldovan dishes